The Haitian records in swimming are the fastest ever performances of swimmers from Haiti, which are recognized and ratified by the Fédération Haitienne des Sports Aquatiques (FHSA).

All records were set in finals unless noted otherwise.

Long Course (50 m)

Men

Women

Short Course (25 m)

Men

Women

References

External links
Federation Haitienne des Sports Aquatiques

Haiti
Records
Swimming
Swimming